The Christina Church is a church building in eastern Jönköping in Sweden. Belonging to Jönköping Christina-Ljungarum Parish of the Church of Sweden, it was opened on 20 April 1673.

References

External links

Churches in Jönköping
17th-century Church of Sweden church buildings
Churches completed in 1673
1673 establishments in Sweden
Churches in the Diocese of Växjö